Drusilla van Hengel (born September 9, 1963) is an American sprint canoer who competed in the mid-1990s. She was eliminated in the semifinals of the K-4 500 m event at the 1996 Summer Olympics in Atlanta.

External links
Sports-Reference.com profile

1963 births
American female canoeists
Canoeists at the 1996 Summer Olympics
Living people
Olympic canoeists of the United States
21st-century American women